The U.S. state of Delaware is divided into three counties, the fewest of any state in the United States: New Castle, Kent and Sussex. The origin of the county boundaries goes back to their former court districts. The powers of the counties' legislative bodies are limited to issues such as zoning and development.

Politics and government
Each county elects a legislative body (known in New Castle and Sussex counties as the County Council, and in Kent County as the Levy Court). The counties are able to raise taxes and borrow money. They also have control over garbage disposal, water supply, sewerage, zoning, development, and building codes.

Most functions which are handled on a county-by-county basis in other states—such as court and law enforcement—have been centralized in Delaware, leading to a significant concentration of power in the Delaware state government. The counties were historically divided into hundreds, which were used as tax reporting and voting districts until the 1960s. However, the hundreds now serve no administrative role; their only current official legal use is in real-estate title descriptions.

History
Following the English conquest of 1664, all of the land on the western side of the Delaware River and Delaware Bay was governed as part of the New York Colony and administered from the town of New Castle. During the brief recapture of the colony by the Dutch in 1673, additional court districts were created around Upland and Whorekill. The latter was also known as Hoornkill, and is now the town of Lewes. The court at New Castle was left with the central portion of the colony. The jurisdiction left to the court at became New Castle County, and the county seat remained at New Castle until 1881 when it was moved to Wilmington. In 1680, Whorekill District was divided into Deale County and St. Jones County. After this division, Lewes became the county seat of  Deale, which was later renamed Sussex County. The former Upland District was named after the New Sweden settlement of Upland, and was renamed Chester County in 1682. Chester County is now located within the present boundaries of Pennsylvania.

Lord Baltimore, the Proprietor of Maryland, claimed all present-day Delaware, and organized its northern and eastern portions as Durham County, Maryland. However, this county existed only on paper. The southern and western portions of present-day Sussex County were organized as portions of several adjacent Maryland counties and were not recognized as part of Delaware until the Mason-Dixon Survey was run in 1767. In 1791, with the expansion of Sussex County to the south and west, the county seat was moved to Georgetown. The county seat of St. Jones (renamed Kent County in 1681) is at Dover.

After 2000, a fourth "Appoquinimink County" was proposed to be carved out of New Castle County. The effort intended to end the zoning restrictions of the Unified Development Code on the undeveloped farmland. The proposed boundaries extended beyond the Appoquinimink Hundred to include all land south of the C&D Canal, with Middletown as the proposed seat.

County list
The Federal Information Processing Standard (FIPS) code, which is used by the United States government to uniquely identify counties, is provided with each entry. The FIPS code for each county links to census data for that county.

|}

References

External links
 Kent County
 New Castle County 
 Sussex County

 
Delaware, counties in
Counties